Harry Carew Gower (24 December 1874 – 2 October 1930) was an  Australian rules footballer who played with St Kilda in the Victorian Football League (VFL).

References

External links 

1874 births
1930 deaths
Australian rules footballers from Victoria (Australia)
St Kilda Football Club players
Australian rules footballers from South Australia
People from Mount Barker, South Australia